Agusan del Sur's at-large congressional district is an obsolete congressional district that encompassed the entire province of Agusan del Sur in the Philippines. It was represented in the House of Representatives from 1969 to 1972, in the Regular Batasang Pambansa from 1984 to 1986, and in the restored House of Representatives from 1987 to 2010. The province of Agusan del Sur was created as a result of the partition of Agusan in 1967 and elected its first representative provincewide at-large during the 1969 Philippine House of Representatives elections. It was a short-lived district for the Third Philippine Republic Congress, having been eliminated following the dissolution of the lower house in 1972. The province was later absorbed by the multi-member Region X's at-large district for the national parliament in 1978. In 1984, provincial and city representations were restored and Agusan del Sur elected a member for the regular parliament. The district was re-established ahead of the 1987 Philippine House of Representatives elections and continued to elect representatives until Agusan del Sur was reapportioned in 2008 and which took effect in 2010.

Representation history

See also
Legislative districts of Agusan del Sur

References

Former congressional districts of the Philippines
Politics of Agusan del Sur
1967 establishments in the Philippines
2008 disestablishments in the Philippines
At-large congressional districts of the Philippines
Congressional districts of Caraga
Constituencies established in 1967
Constituencies disestablished in 1972
Constituencies established in 1984
Constituencies disestablished in 2008